Cristian Gonzalo Olivera Ibarra (born 17 April 2002) is a Uruguayan professional footballer who plays as a right winger for Uruguayan Primera División club Boston River, on loan from La Liga club Almería.

Club career

Early career
Born in Montevideo, Uruguay, Olivera started his career at the age of three in Club Arapey Mendoza. He subsequently represented Potencia, Club Flores Palma de Baby Fútbol, Club Danubio, Cerrito, Danubio and Defensor Sporting before joining Rentistas in 2018.

Rentistas
In September 2018, aged just 16, Olivera signed his first professional contract with Rentistas. He made his first team debut for on 5 May of the following year, coming on as a second-half substitute for goalscorer Renato César in a 1–0 Uruguayan Segunda División away win against Central Español.

Olivera scored his first senior goal on 20 July 2019, netting the opener in a 2–1 away defeat of Villa Teresa, and ended the season with three goals in 25 appearances overall, as his club achieved promotion to Primera División. He made his debut in the top tier on 16 February 2020, starting in a 2–0 home success over Nacional.

Olivera scored his first goal in the top tier on 22 February 2020, netting the equalizer in a 3–2 win at Boston River, and was an important unit in Rentistas' start of the campaign, as his club won five of their first ten league matches.

Almería
On 15 September 2020, Olivera moved abroad for the first time in his career, after signing a five-year deal with Spanish Segunda División side UD Almería for a rumoured fee of €2 million.

Olivera failed to establish himself as a regular option for the Andalusians and was demoted to the reserves in January 2021. On 3 May 2021, he returned to his home country after agreeing to a one-year loan deal with Uruguayan Primera División club Peñarol. This was followed by another loan to Boston River in the same league, starting in 2022.

Career statistics

Club

Honours
Peñarol
 Uruguayan Primera División: 2021
 Supercopa Uruguaya: 2022

References

External links
 
 

2002 births
Living people
Association football wingers
Uruguayan footballers
Uruguay youth international footballers
Uruguayan Primera División players
Uruguayan Segunda División players
C.A. Rentistas players
Peñarol players
Boston River players
Segunda División players
Tercera División players
UD Almería players
UD Almería B players
Uruguayan expatriate footballers
Uruguayan expatriate sportspeople in Spain
Expatriate footballers in Spain